John "Jack" Hammond (30 September 1884 – 5 June 1971) was a former Australian rules footballer who played with Carlton and Melbourne in the Victorian Football League (VFL).

Family	
The son of Thomas Hammond, and Ann Hammond, née Williams, John Hammond was born on 30 September 1884. Two of his brothers, Charlie Hammond (1886-1936), and Billy Hammond (1887-1919) also played VFL football.

He married Millicent Evelyn Iverson (1897-1960) in 1921.

Football 
During a Melbourne practice match against VFA club Hawthorn, on 13 April 1908 at the MCG, Hammond slipped and fell heavily to the ground, fracturing his right leg below the knee. He never played again.

Notes

External links 
 	
 		
 Jack Hammond's profile at Blueseum	
 Jack Hammond's profile at Demonwiki

1884 births
1971 deaths
Australian rules footballers from Melbourne
Carlton Football Club players
Melbourne Football Club players
People from South Melbourne